The 2003 NCAA Division I Women's Tennis Championships were the 22nd annual championships to determine the national champions of NCAA Division I women's singles, doubles, and team collegiate tennis in the United States.

Hosts Florida defeated two-time defending champions Stanford in the team final, 4–3, to claim their fourth national title.

Host
This year's tournaments were hosted by the University of Florida at the Ring Tennis Complex in Gainesville, Florida.

The men's and women's NCAA tennis championships would not be held jointly until 2006.

See also
NCAA Division II Tennis Championships (Men, Women)
NCAA Division III Tennis Championships (Men, Women)

References

External links
List of NCAA Women's Tennis Champions

NCAA Division I tennis championships
NCAA Division I Women's Tennis Championships
NCAA Division I Women's Tennis Championships
NCAA Division I Women's Tennis Championships